9 Channel Nine Court (alternatively known as the CTV Toronto Studios, CFTO-TV Studios, Glen Warren Studios or Bell Media Agincourt and temporarily known as 9 Dave Devall Way) is an office and studio complex owned by Bell Media (formerly CTVglobemedia) in the Agincourt neighbourhood of Scarborough, Toronto, Ontario, Canada. The civic address of the complex refers to the over-the-air channel on which CFTO-TV, the building's original tenant, broadcast. It is located at the northwest corner of the intersection of Highway 401 and McCowan Road near the Scarborough City Centre.

History
CTV Television Network started using the studio for CTV News's local Toronto broadcasts in the mid-1960s; its head offices were located in Downtown Toronto. Original programming included the weekly children's show The Professor's Hideaway.

The station was acquired by CFTO's parent, Baton Broadcasting, in 1997. It is now home to CTV, its flagship station CFTO-DT (CTV Toronto), and The Sports Network (TSN). It was previously the headquarters of CTVglobemedia and its predecessors until it was relocated to 299 Queen Street West in 2008 when it became Bell Media.

Operations
In addition to CTV and CFTO, channels based at the Agincourt complex include:
CTV News Channel
TSN
Discovery Channel, and its offshoot channels including Animal Planet among others.

The complex also houses the master control facilities for several other CTV stations in Eastern and Central Canada, specifically:
CJOH-DT Ottawa
CKCO-DT Kitchener
CFCF-DT Montreal
CKY-DT Winnipeg
CTV Northern Ontario

CTV 2 had its master control facilities moved here in 2011, housing the following stations:
CKVR-DT Barrie 
CKVP-DT Pelham
CFPL-DT London
CHWI-DT Wheatley/Windsor
CHRO-DT Pembroke/Ottawa
CTV 2 Atlantic
CTV 2 Alberta
In addition the building also serves as the new home for the technical operations of Bell Media's all-sports radio station in Toronto TSN Radio 1050 which launched on April 13, 2011.

TSN, Sportsnet, and the "parking lot"
From 2001 until early 2008, both TSN and its main competitor Rogers Sportsnet were based at the Agincourt complex. Sportsnet, originally controlled by CTV before the latter's acquisition of TSN in 2000, had been based there since its launch in 1998, but did not move out immediately after TSN moved in.

Hence, when on-air hosts, such as Darren Dreger, moved from one channel to the other, it was referred to as "crossing the parking lot" or, less commonly, "crossing the street". Some at Sportsnet had complained about feeling like "poor country cousins" to CTV and TSN at Agincourt.

This peculiarity had been made light of by a couple of notable hosts on Rogers Sportsnet. Bob McCown, a radio host on Rogers-owned The Fan 590, had constantly commented on his show Prime Time Sports (a simulcast of his radio show on The Fan 590) that Sportsnet executives throw bottles across the street at the TSN studios. In addition, Sportsnet Connected anchor Sean McCormick had openly stated on-air that he drives to work with his wife, Jennifer Hedger, who anchors SportsCentre on TSN.

This arrangement ended on April 30, 2008, when Rogers Sportsnet moved broadcast operations from the Agincourt complex to a new studio in the Rogers Building, a cluster of buildings in the Mount Pleasant-Jarvis Street area of downtown Toronto.

Other Bell Media facilities in Toronto
Alongside 9 Channel Nine Court, several other Bell Media properties are operated from other facilities in the Toronto area:

Several other Bell Media television channels, mainly including those acquired from CHUM Limited– such as Much, CTV Comedy Channel, CTV Drama Channel, CTV Life Channel, MTV2, CP24, BNN Bloomberg, CTV Sci-Fi Channel and E!, are operated from 299 Queen Street West, formerly known as the "CHUM-City Building". This location also serves as the current home of CTV's entertainment news program etalk, the corporate head office of Bell Media and the CFTO Downtown Toronto news bureau.
Studios for Bell Media's radio channels including TSN Radio 1050, 104.5 CHUM-FM, Newstalk 1010 and 99.9 Virgin Radio are currently located at 250 Richmond Street West at Richmond and Duncan streets which is adjacent to 299 Queen Street West. There is a bridge walkway that currently joins these two buildings together.

References

External links
CTV Television Network website
CTV News website
CTV News Toronto website
Bell Media website

Bell Media
Buildings and structures in Scarborough, Toronto
Mass media company headquarters in Canada
Television studios in Canada